Munuki FC is a South Sudanese football club located in Juba, South Sudan which currently plays in the South Sudan Football Championship.

History 
The Club was founded as Munuki Social, Cultural and Sports Club and plays at the 10,357 capacity Munuki Playing Ground.</ref>

Current squad (2020-2021)

Notoble coaches 

 Nicola Peter 
 Peter Orot

Notable former players 

 Jimmy Wani Boja
 Emmanuel Juma
 Dennis Deng
 Sebit Juma
 Jimmy Mandela
 Pal Paul Puk
 Chan Peter

References

External links

Football clubs in South Sudan